Pich Min Tonn Chnai is a 1992 comedy movie starring Tep Rundaro, Pisith Pilika, Kai Prasith, and Ampor Tevi.

Cast
Kai Prasith
Tep Rundaro
Pisith Pilika
Ampor Tevi

References

Cambodian comedy films
Khmer-language films
1992 films